Feliks Więcek (10 November 1904 – 17 August 1978) was a Polish racing cyclist. He won the 1928 edition of the Tour de Pologne.

References

External links

1904 births
1978 deaths
Polish male cyclists
People from Ostrzeszów County